Tatiana Gusin (born 26 January 1994) is a Greek high jumper. She competed in the women's high jump at the 2017 World Championships in Athletics.

References

External links
 

1994 births
Living people
Naturalized citizens of Greece
Greek female high jumpers
World Athletics Championships athletes for Greece
People from Orhei
20th-century Greek women
21st-century Greek women
Athletes (track and field) at the 2022 Mediterranean Games
Mediterranean Games silver medalists for Slovenia
Mediterranean Games medalists in athletics